Charles Robert Miller (September 30, 1857 – September 18, 1927) was an American lawyer and politician from Wilmington, Delaware. He was a member of the Republican Party, who served in the Delaware General Assembly and as Governor of Delaware.

Life and career
Miller was born on September 30, 1857 in West Chester, Pennsylvania, the son of Margaretta (Black) and Robert Miller. He graduated from Swarthmore College in 1879 and the University of Pennsylvania Law School in 1881. He had married Abigail Morgan Woodnutt in 1874 and they had three children, Thomas W., Clement W., and Mrs. Forest Willard. Charles and family were members of the Episcopal Church.  Shortly afterwards he came to Delaware as a lawyer for the Wilmington Malleable Iron Company. Miller served one term in the Delaware State Senate, during the 1911/1912 session. After he left state office he practiced law in Wilmington and was president of the Wilmington Farmer's Bank.

Governor of Delaware
Miller was elected Governor of Delaware in 1912 by defeating Thomas M. Monaghan, the Democratic Party candidate. 1912 was a Democratic sweep, except for Miller's narrow victory, perhaps attributed to the fact that Monaghan, his opponent, was a Roman Catholic.

During his term ferry service was initiated between New Castle, Delaware and Penns Grove, New Jersey and the Lewes and Rehoboth Canal was built. Women were also first admitted to Delaware College. The major event, however, was the outbreak of World War I in Europe and the effect in Delaware of the rapid expansion of demand for gunpowder. At the war's commencement, Miller and his wife were on a German passenger ship, and after an exciting chase up the English Channel, he and others persuaded the German captain to give up his ship to his British pursuers.

Death and legacy
Miller died while visiting a friend at Berlin, New Jersey and is buried in the Wilmington and Brandywine Cemetery at Wilmington. His son, Thomas W. Miller, was the U.S. representative from Delaware during the last two years of his term. His grandson, Clement W. Miller, was a U.S. representative from California from 1959 until 1962.

Almanac
Elections are held the first Tuesday after November 1. Members of the Delaware General Assembly take office the second Tuesday of January. State senators have a four-year term. The governor takes office the third Tuesday of January and has a four-year term.

References

Images
Hall of Governors Portrait Gallery ; Portrait courtesy of Historical and Cultural Affairs, Dover.

External links
Biographical Directory of the Governors of the United States
Delaware’s Governors 

The Political Graveyard

Places with more information
Delaware Historical Society; website; 505 North Market Street, Wilmington, Delaware 19801; (302) 655-7161
University of Delaware; Library website; 181 South College Avenue, Newark, Delaware 19717; (302) 831-2965

1857 births
1927 deaths
American Episcopalians
Burials at Wilmington and Brandywine Cemetery
People from West Chester, Pennsylvania
People from Wilmington, Delaware
Swarthmore College alumni
University of Pennsylvania Law School alumni
Delaware lawyers
Republican Party Delaware state senators
Republican Party governors of Delaware
19th-century American lawyers